Meara is a feminine given name and a surname, similar to O'Meara.

List of people with the given name 
 Meara Conway, Canadian politician

List of people with the surname 
 Anne Meara (1929–2015), American comedian and actress
 David Meara (born 1947), British Anglican priest
 James Meara (born 1972), British former footballer
 Ryan Meara (born 1990), American soccer player

See also
Meara (disambiguation)

Feminine given names
English feminine given names
Irish feminine given names
Surnames of Irish origin
Surnames of British Isles origin
Anglicised Irish-language surnames